Club Sportivo Ben Hur is an Argentine sports club from Rafaela, Santa Fe Province. The club was founded in 1940 and is mostly known for its basketball and football teams.

Other sports practised in the club are aerobics, bowls, chess, field hockey, and swimming.

Basketball
Basketball is the sport that gave the most important successes to the club, winning the 2004–05 national championship, and the Liga Sudamericana 2006 among other titles. The club's in-doors arena is the Coliseo del Sur.

Titles
Liga Nacional de Básquet: 1
2004–05
Liga Sudamericana: 1
2006
Torneo Nacional de Ascenso: 1
2001–02
Liga Federativa C: 1
1994–95

Football
Football has been the main activity of the club since its foundation, although Ben Hur has achieved important titles in basketball as well. In its early years, Ben Hur started playing in the local league of Rafaela, but it was not until 1997 when Ben Hur left the regional tournaments to join the Argentine Football Association. The club subsequently won the Torneo Argentino A (the regionalized third division of the Argentine football league system) in 2004 promoting to Primera B Nacional. Then Ben Hur would be relegated to upper divisions and currently plays in the Torneo Argentino B.

Ber Hur football stadium is the Estadio Parque Barrio Ilolay.

Titles
Torneo Argentino A: 1
 2004–05
Torneo Argentino C: 1
 1996–97

References

External links

 
La BH blog 

 
Football clubs in Santa Fe Province
Association football clubs established in 1940
Basketball teams in Argentina
Basketball teams established in 1940
1940 establishments in Argentina